Semblance may refer to:

 Semblance (video game), a 2018 video game by Nyamakop
 Semblance analysis, a process used in the refinement and study of seismic data